Mia Station is an underground station on the Seoul Subway Line 4. It is located in Mia-dong, Gangbuk-gu, Seoul, South Korea. Its station subname is Seoul Cyber Univ., where said university is nearby.

Station layout

Surrounding area
 Seoul Cyber University

References 

Seoul Metropolitan Subway stations
Railway stations in South Korea opened in 1985
Metro stations in Gangbuk District